IP E-Game Ventures Inc., also known as IP E-Games, was an online game publisher based in the Philippines under the IPVG Corporation.  In April 2012, IP E-Games ceased all operations in line with their merger into Level Up! Games Inc. The company published online entertainment casual games along with massively multiplayer online role-playing games (MMORPG).

Titles

Published titles 
 Ran Online
 Cabal Online
 Audition Online (as Dance Battle Audition)
 Jade Dynasty (as Zhu Xian Online)
 Runes of Magic
 Point Blank
 Granado Espada
Bandmaster

Past titles 
 Dreamville
 Battle Position
 O2Jam
 Supreme Destiny
 Superstar
 Operation 7
 Dragonica
 Nostale

Unpublished titles 
 Topspeed

References

Video game publishers
Video game companies of the Philippines
Companies listed on the Philippine Stock Exchange
Video game companies established in 2005
2005 establishments in the Philippines
Companies based in Pasig